Ramsgate Maritime Museum is a maritime museum in Ramsgate, Kent, England, that describes the maritime history of East Kent. The museum is situated in the Clock House on the quayside of the Royal Harbour at Ramsgate.

Ramsgate Maritime Museum is run by the Steam Museum Trust, a registered charity.

Buildings
The museum is housed in buildings leased from Thanet District Council.

The Clock House was built in 1817 by Benjamen Wyatt and George Louch. It was later altered by John Rennie and has now been designated as a Grade II* listed building.

Exhibits
There are four permanent galleries covering the development of the harbour, navigation, fishing, lifeboats and shipwrecks.  A fifth exhibition space houses a 17th-century 32-pounder demi-cannon raised from the wreck of HMS Stirling Castle.  A number of artefacts come from the nearby Goodwin Sands which is responsible for numerous shipwrecks.

Exhibits include two museum ships: the 1946 steam tug Cervia and Sundowner, a 1912 Dunkirk little ship.

The museum reopened on 5 May 2012, having been closed for several years, and plans are afoot to completely revamp the Clock House building and Pier Yard surrounds.

See also
 Port of Ramsgate
 Ramsgate Lifeboat Station

References

External links

 
 The Steam Museum Trust website

Maritime museums in England
Ramsgate
Museums in Thanet District
Grade II* listed buildings in Kent